PV1 may refer to:

 3',4'-Methylenedioxy-α-pyrrolidinopropiophenone
 Private, an enlisted rank in the US Army